This article details the qualifying phase for wrestling at the 2016 Summer Olympics. The competition at these Games comprised a total of 344 athletes coming from the different nations; each had been allowed to enter a maximum of 18 (1 per event).

Four places had been reserved for the host nation Brazil, and four more for the Tripartite Commission to invite wrestlers. The remaining spots were allocated through the qualification process, wherein the athletes earn places for their respective nation. For each place obtained by the host country in the qualification phase, one of these three reserved places was allocated to the Tripartite Commission.

Timeline

Qualification summary

Men's freestyle events

57 kg

65 kg

74 kg

86 kg

97 kg

125 kg

Men's Greco-Roman events

59 kg

66 kg

75 kg

85 kg

98 kg

130 kg

Women's freestyle events

48 kg

53 kg

58 kg

63 kg

69 kg

75 kg

Notes

References

External links
United World Wrestling

Qualification
2016